Paradieswärts Düül is a 1970 psychedelic rock album by the German band Amon Düül.  It was the final Amon Düül (I) album to be recorded.  In contrast to the communal, free-form improvisations of the earlier Amon Düül albums (generally thought to have all been recorded in a single "jam session" with various commune members coming and going throughout), Paradieswarts Düül was recorded with a smaller, more stable lineup of musicians.  The pastoral, folk-influenced sound of the record has been compared to the gentler work of American bands Love and The Velvet Underground.   The first word of the title is a German construction meaning "paradise-wards", as in "towards paradise".

The album was re-released on CD in 1996 by Spalax Records. This version added two bonus tracks, from the single "Eternal Flow / Paramechanical World" released slightly before the album. This same master was also used for the 1997 edition issued by Repertoire Records in Germany.

Though the groups had split apart some years before due to differing musical aims, the album features contributions from Amon Düül II members John Weinzierl and Chris 'Shrat' Thiele on the track "Paramechanische Welt".  In turn Rainer and Ulrich of Amon Düül (I) had appeared on the track "Sandoz in the Rain" on Amon Düül II's album Yeti, recorded the same year.

Track listing
"Love Is Peace" – 17:09
"Snow Your Thirst and Sun Your Open Mouth" – 9:25
"Paramechanische Welt" – 7:38

Bonus tracks:
<li>"Eternal Flow" – 4:10
<li>"Paramechanical World" – 5:44

Personnel
Album tracks

"Love Is Peace"
Rainer "Dadam" Bauer - lead vocals, acoustic guitar, lyrics
Ulrich Leopold - bass, backing vocals, piano
Ella Bauer - harp, bongos
Klaus "Lemur" Esser - percussion, backing vocals, melody guitar
Hansi Fischer - flute, bongos

"Snow Your Thurst And Sun Your Open Mouth"
Ulrich Leopold - guitar
Klaus "Lemur" Esser - fuzz guitar
Rainer "Dadam" Bauer - bass
Helge Filanda - drums
Angelika "Noam" Filanda - African drums

"Paramechanische Welt"
Rainer "Dadam" Bauer - vocals, guitar
Ulrich Leopold - guitar
John Weinzierl - guitar
Chris 'Shrat' Thiele - bongos

Bonus single tracks
Ulrich Leopold - bass, guitar, trumpet, drums, vocals 
Rainer Bauer - guitar, bass, vocals
Klaus Esser - guitar, bass, drums, vocals
Helge Filanda - drums, guitar, vocals 
Angelika Filanda - flute, vocals 
Ella Bauer - harp, vocals

References

1970 albums
Amon Düül albums
German-language albums
Ohr (record label) albums